Lakhish is a moshav in the northern Negev in south-central Israel. Located south-east of Kiryat Gat, it falls under the jurisdiction of Lakhish Regional Council.

History
The moshav was founded as a Nahal settlement in 1955 on the land of the depopulated Palestinian village of al-Qubayba. Named after Lachish, the ancient town of the same name, which is now an archaeological tel, just north of the moshav.

Economy
The economy of Lakhish is based on the cultivation and sale of grapes. In 2006, the moshav built a large reservoir with a capacity of 1.25 million cubic meters
to irrigate its 6,000 dunams of vineyards.

Notable residents
Yoav Bruck

References

Moshavim
Nahal settlements
Populated places established in 1955
Populated places in Southern District (Israel)
1955 establishments in Israel